Terrence Tyler Magee (born March 16, 1993) is a former American football running back. He was signed by the Baltimore Ravens as an undrafted free agent following the 2015 NFL Draft. He played college football at LSU.

Professional career

Baltimore Ravens
Following the 2015 NFL Draft, Magee was signed by the Baltimore Ravens as an undrafted free agent. On September 5, 2015, he was released by the Ravens. On September 8, 2015, he was re-signed by the Ravens and was added to the active roster. On September 22, 2015, Magee was released by the Ravens to make room for cornerback Will Davis, who the Ravens acquired via trade. He cleared waivers and was signed to the Ravens' practice squad. On October 17, 2015, Jacobs was promoted to the 53-man roster, replacing cornerback Charles James. On October 26, 2015, Magee was waived as the Ravens promoted wide receiver Jeremy Butler. On October 28, 2015, he was re-signed to the practice squad. On November 28, 2015, he was released from practice squad. On December 2, 2015, he was re-signed to the practice squad along with wide receiver Chuck Jacobs. On December 15, 2015, the Ravens promoted Magee and cornerback Jumal Rolle to the active roster, cutting running back Raheem Mostert and placed defensive end Chris Canty on injured reserve. On May 6, 2016, the Ravens waived Magee and wide receiver Chuck Jacobs.

Los Angeles Rams
On June 7, 2016, Magee signed with the Los Angeles Rams. On September 3, 2016, he was waived by the Rams as part of final roster cuts. The next day, he was signed to the Rams' practice squad. On September 9, he was released from the Rams' practice squad.

Seattle Seahawks
On September 21, 2016, Magee was signed to the Seahawks' practice squad. On September 24, he was promoted to the active roster. He was released by the team on September 28, 2016.

Cleveland Browns
On October 26, 2016, Magee was signed to the Cleveland Browns' practice squad.

Seattle Seahawks (second stint)
On December 20, 2016, Magee was signed by the Seahawks off the Browns' practice squad. On May 9, 2017, he was released by the Seahawks.

Cleveland Browns (second stint)
On June 1, 2017, Magee was signed by the Browns. He was waived by the Browns on September 2, 2017 and was signed to the practice squad the next day.

Atlanta Falcons
On November 14, 2017, Magee was signed by the Atlanta Falcons off the Browns' practice squad. He was waived by the Falcons on December 4, 2017 and re-signed to the practice squad. He was promoted to the active roster on January 2, 2018.

On May 15, 2018, Magee was waived by the Falcons. He was re-signed on June 13, 2018. He was waived again on September 1, 2018.

Memphis Express
In 2019, Magee joined the Memphis Express of the Alliance of American Football. The league ceased operations in April 2019.

References

External links
LSU Tigers bio
ESPN profile

1993 births
Living people
Players of American football from Louisiana
People from Franklinton, Louisiana
American football running backs
LSU Tigers football players
Baltimore Ravens players
Los Angeles Rams players
Seattle Seahawks players
Cleveland Browns players
Atlanta Falcons players
Memphis Express (American football) players